= Telleri =

Telleri was a book publisher based in Paris, France.

The company specialised in architecture and art books and was active between 1992 and 2007.
